Lunel is a railway station in Lunel, Occitanie, southern France. Within TER Occitanie, it is part of lines 6 (Narbonne–Marseille), 21 (Narbonne–Avignon) and 22 (Portbou–Avignon).

References

Railway stations in Hérault
Railway stations in France opened in 1845